Live in Orlando may refer to:

Live in Orlando, CD and DVD by Funk Brothers
Live in Orlando (King Crimson album)
Live in Orlando (Trazendo a Arca album)
Live in Orlando, album from Blue Man Group discography